Group A was one of two pools in the Americas Zone Group II of the 1997 Fed Cup. Seven teams competed in a round robin competition, with the top team advancing to Group I in 1998.

Paraguay vs. Panama

Trinidad and Tobago vs. Bahamas

Guatemala vs. Barbados

Paraguay vs. Barbados

Dominican Republic vs. Panama

Guatemala vs. Bahamas

Paraguay vs. Bahamas

Dominican Republic vs. Trinidad and Tobago

Panama vs. Barbados

Dominican Republic vs. Barbados

Trinidad and Tobago vs. Guatemala

Panama vs. Bahamas

Paraguay vs. Trinidad and Tobago

Dominican Republic vs. Guatemala

Bahamas vs. Barbados

Paraguay vs. Guatemala

Dominican Republic vs. Bahamas

Trinidad and Tobago vs. Panama

Paraguay vs. Dominican Republic

Trinidad and Tobago vs. Barbados

Panama vs. Guatemala

  placed first in the pool, and thus advanced to Group I in 1998, where they placed second overall.

See also
Fed Cup structure

References

External links
 Fed Cup website

1997 Fed Cup Americas Zone